The Patayani thappu is an Indian frame drum with a wooden frame. It is played with the hands. Thappu is used in the ritual art of Kerala known as Padayani, in which the drum accompanies stylized dance movements and provides percussive music in a rhythmic ensemble.  Some of the rhythmic patterns performed are Champa, Kaarika, Kumba, Adantha and Marma. In devotional music it is usually accompanied by traditional cymbals called elathalam. Different rhythmic ensembles can be produced by blending thappu with chenda drum.

See also
 Parai

References
 Page of government of Kerala

External links
 Percussion Instrument of Patayani: Thappu 
 Thappu kottu 

Membranophones
Medicine drums
Indian musical instruments